Ryan Zoghlin is an artist and photographer.

Biography 
After gaining a solid technical background in photographic illustration from Rochester Institute of Technology, Ryan explored photography as an art form at School of the Art Institute of Chicago, where he received his BFA in photography and sculpture in 1991. Images from his series "Airshow" are included in the collections of the Museum of Fine Arts, Houston and have been included in Midwest Photographers Project at the Museum of Contemporary Photography in Chicago. These images have also been published in Black & White Magazine and the Center for Photography at Woodstocks, Photography Quarterly.

Photography 
Zoghlin works in many alternative process such as orotone, kallitype, and cyanotype etc. His orotones from the series "Aerotones" are produced on glass and backed with 23.5 karat gold powder. These images are considered examples of modern orotones by the Research on the Conservation of Photographs Project at the Getty Conservation Institute.

Sources
 Black & White Magazine. Novato, CA: Ross Periodicals. December 2003, Issue #28, Pages 118–121
 Photography Quarterly. Center for Photography at Woodstock, Woodstock NY, Issue #91, 2005 Pages 16–17
 Camera Arts. March/April 2007 Artist Showcase Page 12.

External links
 http://www.photoreview.org/competition/portfolio.php/38/1
 http://www.mocp.org/collection/mpp/past/zoghlin_ryan.php

Rochester Institute of Technology alumni
American photographers
New Trier High School alumni
Living people
Year of birth missing (living people)